Juan Pablo García-Berdoy (born 9 March 1961) is a Spanish diplomat and lawyer who served as the 8th Ambassador Permanent Representative of Spain to the European Union from 2016 to 2021. Previously, he has served as ambassador of Spain to Romania, Moldova and Germany, as well as director-general in the Ministry of Foreign Affairs.

Biography 
García Berdoy was born in the City of Madrid in 1961. He has a degree in law and speak five languages: Spanish, English, French, German and Romanian. He is married and he has two children.

He started his diplomatic career in May 1987 when he was appointed Technical Advisor to the Cabinet of the Minister of Foreign Affairs, Francisco Fernández Ordóñez. In 1988 he was appointed Consul of Spain to Manila, being appointed Technical Advisor again in 1990. A few months later, he was appointed Technical Advisor for the Relations of Spain with the Central and Eastern European countries.

From December 1991 to January 1996, García-Berdoy was Advisor to the Ambassador of Spain to Germany being in charge of european affairs. During this period, he was also a relevant member of the Directorate for European Affairs of the German Foreign Ministry and member of the Presidency of the Reflection Group for the reform of the Maastricht Treaty. In 1996, he was appointed Chief of Staff to the Secretary of State for the European Union and in 2000 he was appointed Chief of Staff to the President of the Congress of Deputies. Between 2002 and 2004, he served as Director-General for Foreign Policy for Europe in the Foreign Ministry.

He assumed the office of ambassador for the first time in January 2005 when he was appointed Ambassador of Spain to Romania and in June he was appointed also Ambassador of Spain to Moldova. He left this positions in 2009 to found the Aspen Institute Spain.

In March 2012, prime minister Mariano Rajoy appointed him Ambassador of Spain to Germany and in December 2016 he was appointed Ambassador Permanent Representative of Spain to the European Union when Alfonso Dastis was appointed Foreign Minister. In July 2021, Marcos Alonso Alonso was appointed as his replacement.

References 

1961 births
Living people
Ambassadors of Spain to Germany
Commanders Crosses of the Order of Merit of the Federal Republic of Germany